Dash Bolaghi (also Romanized as Dāsh Bolāghī; also known as Dāsh Bolāgh and Dāshbolāgh) is a village in Naqdi Rural District, Meshgin-e Sharqi District, Meshgin Shahr County, Ardabil Province, Iran. At the 2006 census, its population was 27, in 7 families.

References 

Towns and villages in Meshgin Shahr County